Kejel Tyson (born 26 October 1990) is a West Indian cricketer. He played his List A cricket match for West Indies under-19 cricket team in the President's Cup (West Indies) 2009-10 on 28 October 2009.

References

External links
 

1990 births
Living people